Stephen Mills Badger II (born September 18, 1968) is an American businessman, venture capitalist and documentary producer. He is currently a General Partner at The March Group, a food, health and sustainability venture capital firm based out of Davis, California and Hong Kong.

Early life
Stephen Mills Badger is a member of the Mars family, His mother is Mars heiress Jacqueline Mars. His father was David H. Badger. His maternal great-grandfather, Franklin Clarence Mars, was the founder of Mars, Incorporated.

Career
Badger is currently a General Partner at The March Group. He also serves on the Board of Directors of Mars, Inc, his family business. In 2007, he spoke on behalf of Seeds of Change, a retailer of organic food acquired by Mars, Inc. In November 2014, he attended the third annual Global Action Summit in Nashville, Tennessee, where he accepted the Global Shared Value Award on behalf of the company.

Additionally, Badger serves on the Board of Directors of Island Press, a publisher of books on ecology and conservation.

In 2012-2013, Badger produced Muscle Shoals, a documentary film about FAME Studios and Muscle Shoals Sound Studio in Muscle Shoals, Alabama.

Personal life
He resides in Santa Fe, New Mexico.

References

Living people
1968 births
People from Santa Fe, New Mexico
American corporate directors
American film producers
Mars family